Andro Franca (born 18 October 1987) is a Dutch footballer who plays for amateur side Kozakken Boys. He previously played for Feyenoord and NAC Breda.

External links
 Player profile at NAC Breda

1987 births
Living people
Dutch footballers
Dutch sportspeople of Surinamese descent
Footballers from Rotterdam
Kozakken Boys players
Association football forwards
NAC Breda players